Frederick Joseph Zahner (June 5, 1870 - July 24, 1900) was a professional baseball catcher. He played two seasons in Major League Baseball with the Louisville Colonels in 1894 and 1895. He died at the age of 30 when he fell out of a boat and drowned in Louisville, Kentucky.

References

External links

1870 births
1900 deaths
Major League Baseball catchers
Louisville Colonels players
Charleston Seagulls players
Mobile Bluebirds players
Atlanta (minor league baseball) players
Grand Rapids Gold Bugs players
Kansas City Blues (baseball) players
Dubuque (minor league baseball) players
Syracuse Stars (minor league baseball) players
Rochester Brownies players
Montreal Royals players
Buffalo Bisons (minor league) players
Baseball players from Louisville, Kentucky
19th-century baseball players
Accidental deaths in Kentucky
Deaths by drowning in the United States